Shandryholove is a village in Kramatorsk Raion (district) in Donetsk Oblast of eastern Ukraine, at about  north by west from the centre of Donetsk city. It belongs to Lyman rural hromada, one of the hromadas of Ukraine.

The village came under attack by Russian forces in May 2022, during the Russian invasion of Ukraine. It was liberated by the Ukrainian forces during the Kharkiv counteroffensive on 29 September 2022.

References

Villages in Kramatorsk Raion
Izyumsky Uyezd